Paris Paris is a Canadian comedy TV series directed by Dominic Desjardins and broadcast on Unis TV. The series is produced by Zazie Films and stars Benoît Mauffette, Maxim Roy, Rossif Sutherland, Jeanne Guittet, Balzac Zukerman-Desjardins, Hugues Boucher, and featuring Yves Jacques.

Synopsis 
Philippe lives in Paris. He dreams of literature, theatre and culture. The problem is that he does not live in Paris, France, but in Paris, Ontario, a quiet little town far from everything, where the only culture is agri-culture. After losing his job as a French teacher, he starts to question his accomplishments. His wife Jenny, his in-laws, and even his 10-year-old son Tom are concerned he’s depressed. Philippe takes a lifetime of pent up frustration out of his old furnace, where he finds a hidden tunnel. The tunnel leads him to a trapdoor, which opens onto a theatre stage. Only, he’s no longer in Ontario, but in France. He starts to lead a double life in both cities, until what happens on one end of the tunnel starts to impact the other.

Cast

Episodes (season 1)

Release 
On January 4, 2022, the first season of Paris Paris was broadcast on Unis TV. The entire first season became available to stream on Unis TV.
On October 5, 2022, the first season became available to stream in English on CBC Gem.

Reception 
On the occasion of Paris Paris's Unis TV premiere, Le Devoir's Amélie Gaudreau called the series an "unusual, funny and smart work". "Paris Paris hit the target when it uses the sad fate reserved for Francophones minority setting as a comic relief. This creates memorable scenes, which sometimes makes you want to cry more than laugh." Le Droit's Yves Bergeras called the series "succulent", praising its "cheerful" cast.

References

External link 
 Internet Movie Database: https://www.imdb.com/title/tt15125760/ 

2022 Canadian television series debuts
2020s Canadian comedy television series